Arlington State Forest covers   in Arlington, Vermont in Bennington County. The forest is managed by the Vermont Department of Forests, Parks, and Recreation for timber resources and wildlife habitat.

References

External links
Official website

Vermont state forests
Protected areas of Bennington County, Vermont
Arlington, Vermont
Protected areas established in 1913
1913 establishments in Vermont